David Hart (born 3 March 1964) is a former Australian rules footballer who played with West Coast in the AFL. Although he was born in Victoria he was brought up in the West Australian town of Bruce Rock. He played seven games for West Perth, followed by 55 games with South Fremantle before being recruited by West Coast.

A rover come defender, Hart played in West Coast's inaugural VFL side in 1987. His best season came in 1994 when he earned All Australian selection and won a premiership.

In 1996 he was named in the backline in West Coast's Team of the Decade.

Statistics

|-
|- style="background-color: #EAEAEA"
! scope="row" style="text-align:center" | 1987
|style="text-align:center;"|
| 36 || 17 || 23 || 12 || 203 || 63 || 266 || 59 || 14 || 1.4 || 0.7 || 11.9 || 3.7 || 15.6 || 3.5 || 0.8 || 0
|-
! scope="row" style="text-align:center" | 1988
|style="text-align:center;"|
| 36 || 20 || 17 || 20 || 255 || 62 || 317 || 55 || 17 || 0.9 || 1.0 || 12.8 || 3.1 || 15.9 || 2.8 || 0.9 || 0
|- style="background-color: #EAEAEA"
! scope="row" style="text-align:center" | 1989
|style="text-align:center;"|
| 36 || 19 || 9 || 22 || 252 || 86 || 338 || 61 || 18 || 0.5 || 1.2 || 13.3 || 4.5 || 17.8 || 3.2 || 0.9 || 0
|-
! scope="row" style="text-align:center" | 1990
|style="text-align:center;"|
| 36 || 18 || 14 || 7 || 213 || 98 || 311 || 44 || 25 || 0.8 || 0.4 || 11.8 || 5.4 || 17.3 || 2.4 || 1.4 || 1
|- style="background-color: #EAEAEA"
! scope="row" style="text-align:center" | 1991
|style="text-align:center;"|
| 36 || 21 || 12 || 7 || 243 || 108 || 351 || 39 || 20 || 0.6 || 0.3 || 11.6 || 5.1 || 16.7 || 1.9 || 1.0 || 3
|-
! scope="row" style="text-align:center" | 1992
|style="text-align:center;"|
| 36 || 9 || 2 || 2 || 99 || 28 || 127 || 16 || 9 || 0.2 || 0.2 || 11.0 || 3.1 || 14.1 || 1.8 || 1.0 || 0
|- style="background-color: #EAEAEA"
! scope="row" style="text-align:center" | 1993
|style="text-align:center;"|
| 36 || 8 || 1 || 1 || 99 || 36 || 135 || 21 || 8 || 0.1 || 0.1 || 12.4 || 4.5 || 16.9 || 2.6 || 1.0 || 2
|-
|style="text-align:center;background:#afe6ba;"|1994†
|style="text-align:center;"|
| 36 || 25 || 9 || 8 || 298 || 118 || 416 || 71 || 24 || 0.4 || 0.3 || 11.9 || 4.7 || 16.6 || 2.8 || 1.0 || 7
|- style="background-color: #EAEAEA"
! scope="row" style="text-align:center" | 1995
|style="text-align:center;"|
| 36 || 19 || 1 || 4 || 207 || 79 || 286 || 54 || 26 || 0.1 || 0.2 || 10.9 || 4.2 || 15.1 || 2.8 || 1.4 || 5
|-
! scope="row" style="text-align:center" | 1996
|style="text-align:center;"|
| 36 || 21 || 6 || 2 || 220 || 87 || 307 || 57 || 29 || 0.3 || 0.1 || 10.5 || 4.1 || 14.6 || 2.7 || 1.4 || 0
|- style="background-color: #EAEAEA"
! scope="row" style="text-align:center" | 1997
|style="text-align:center;"|
| 36 || 7 || 1 || 0 || 30 || 24 || 54 || 13 || 10 || 0.1 || 0.0 || 4.3 || 3.4 || 7.7 || 1.9 || 1.4 || 0
|- class="sortbottom"
! colspan=3| Career
! 184
! 95
! 85
! 2119
! 789
! 2908
! 490
! 200
! 0.5
! 0.5
! 11.5
! 4.3
! 15.8
! 2.7
! 1.1
! 18
|}

References

External links

1964 births
Living people
Australian rules footballers from Western Australia
West Coast Eagles players
West Coast Eagles Premiership players
South Fremantle Football Club players
Western Australian State of Origin players
All-Australians (AFL)
West Perth Football Club players
One-time VFL/AFL Premiership players